S'manga Khumalo (born 29 November 1985) is a South African Thoroughbred horse racing jockey. He is a member of the Jockey Association of South Africa.

In 2013 Khumalo became the first black jockey to win the Durban July Handicap, South Africa's top horse race, on his steed Heavy Metal at age 28.

S'manga Khumalo's family is from KwaMashu township near Durban, South Africa. He saw a horse for the first time when he was fourteen years old.

References

External links
 The Guardian interview
 The Guardian article

Living people
Sportspeople from Durban
South African jockeys
1985 births